The Informant is a 1997 cable TV movie produced by Showtime, starring Cary Elwes and Timothy Dalton. It was directed by Jim McBride and written by Nicholas Meyer based upon the book Field of Blood by Gerald Seymour.

Plot
The film tells the story of Sean Pius McAnally "Gingy" and the journey he makes on his way to becoming a supergrass.  Gingy is reluctantly pulled out of retirement in a caravan in the Republic of Ireland by two IRA men who bring him back to Belfast to perform one last job due to his skill with an RPG. On their way back they are stopped by a British Army patrol led by Lt. David Ferris who introduces himself to Gingy. Gingy initially refuses the job but realises he has no choice after the Chief of the Belfast Brigade briefs him and threatens him. The job entails the killing of a judge using an RPG, during the getaway the gang smash through a roadblock and one of the soldiers from the previous patrol recognises Gingy from the previous checkpoint.

Cast
Anthony Brophy as Sean Pius "Gingy" McAnally
Cary Elwes as Lt. David Ferris
Timothy Dalton as DCI Rennie
Maria Lennon as Roisin McAnally
John Kavanagh as IRA Chief
Seán McGinley as Frankie Conroy
Frankie McCafferty as Dalton
Stuart Graham as Det. Astley

Reception
David Stratton of Variety had criticized the affair between Gingy and Roisin McAnally and the film's conclusion, blaming Nicholas Meyer. He did, however, praise Jim McBride, the director of the film, as well as the main cast and Mark Geraghty and Eva Gardos for production and editing respectively. Stratton also praised the opening credits song "Dirty Old Town" and music by The Pogues in general.

References

External links

1997 films
Northern Irish films
Films set in Northern Ireland
Films directed by Jim McBride
Films about The Troubles (Northern Ireland)
Films about the Irish Republican Army
Films with screenplays by Nicholas Meyer
1997 drama films
1990s English-language films